Troubridge Hill Lighthouse is a lighthouse located on Troubridge Hill on the south coast of Yorke Peninsula in South Australia about  south west of Edithburgh and about  west of Troubridge Point.

History
It was built as part of a project to downgrade the lighthouse  on Troubridge Island to a relatively low-powered automatic operation (later decommissioned) and built a full-powered light on the nearby  Yorke Peninsula coastline. The tower was constructed from unpainted brickwork built of custom-made bricks.  The brickwork construction system was selected as it reportedly offered wind and earthquake loading design benefits.  As it is intended for automatic operation, the tower has no windows.  The innovative use of brickwork in the tower won its procurers an award from the South Australian Clay Brick Association.

See also

 List of lighthouses in Australia

References

External links
 Australian Maritime Safety Authority
 Troubridge Hill Lighthouse Lighthouses of South Australia

Lighthouses completed in 1980
Lighthouses in South Australia
1980 establishments in Australia
Yorke Peninsula